Deacon is an unincorporated community in Deer Creek Township, Cass County, Indiana.

History
A post office was established at Deacon in 1844, and remained in operation until it was discontinued in 1903. The community was named for its first postmaster, William R. Deacon.

Geography

References

Populated places in Cass County, Indiana